Arthrolips is a genus of minute hooded beetles in the family Corylophidae. There are more than 20 described species in Arthrolips.

Species
These 23 species belong to the genus Arthrolips:

 Arthrolips alluaudi (Paulian, 1950)
 Arthrolips cinctus Casey, 1900
 Arthrolips convexiuscula (Motschulsky, 1849)
 Arthrolips decolor (LeConte, 1852)
 Arthrolips fasciata Erichson, 1842
 Arthrolips hetschkoi (Reitter, 1913)
 Arthrolips humilis (Rosenhauer, 1856)
 Arthrolips indescreta (Peyerimhoff, 1917)
 Arthrolips klapperichi Bowestead, 1999
 Arthrolips matthewsi (Csiki, 1900)
 Arthrolips meionitida Bowestead, 1999
 Arthrolips misella
 Arthrolips misellus (LeConte, 1852)
 Arthrolips mollinus (Schwarz, 1878)
 Arthrolips nimius Casey, 1900
 Arthrolips oblonga (Broun, 1893)
 Arthrolips obscura (Sahlberg, 1833)
 Arthrolips palmarum (Paulian, 1950)
 Arthrolips picea (Comolli, 1837)
 Arthrolips robustulus Casey
 Arthrolips scitulus (LeConte, 1852)
 Arthrolips sparsus Casey, 1900
 Arthrolips splendens (Schwarz, 1878)

References

Further reading

External links

 

Corylophidae
Articles created by Qbugbot
Coccinelloidea genera